Croker may refer to:

People

Arts and entertainment
Bithia Mary Croker (née Sheppard, 1849–1920), Anglo-Indian novelist
Brendan Croker (born 1953), British musician
Charlie Croker, Michael Caine's character in the British film The Italian Job
T. F. Dillon Croker (1831–1912), British antiquary and poet
C. Martin Croker (1962–2016), American voice actor and animator
Nigel Croker, fictional character in the British TV programme Mile High
Theo Croker (born 1985), American jazz trumpeter, singer, and bandleader
Thomas Crofton Croker (1798–1854), Irish antiquary

Politics
Cyril Croker (1888–1958), member of the New Zealand Legislative Council
David Croker (1932–2006), British environmental activist
John Wilson Croker (1780–1857), Irish statesman and author

Sport
Garry Croker, Australian Paralympic wheelchair rugby and table tennis player
Jarrod Croker (born 1990), Australian professional rugby league footballer
Jason Croker (born 1973), Australian rugby league player
Norma Croker (1934–2019), Australian former sprinter
Peter Croker (1921–2011), English footballer
Richard Croker (1843–1922), American politician
Robin Croker, British cyclist
Ted Croker (1924–1992), English football administrator

Places
Croker Bay, Nunavut, Canada
Croker Hill, Peak District, England
Croker Island, Northern Territory, Australia
Croker Group, island group that includes Croker Island 
Croker Passage, Antarctica
Croker River, Nunavut, Canada

Sport
An informal name for Croke Park, a sports stadium in Ireland
Croker Oars, Australian manufacturer of rowing oars

See also
Croaker (disambiguation)